Gamsgrat is a mountain on the border of Liechtenstein and Austria in the Rätikon range of the Eastern Alps close to the town of Malbun, with a height of .

References

Mountains of the Alps
Mountains of Liechtenstein
Mountains of Vorarlberg
Austria–Liechtenstein border
International mountains of Europe